Iolaus iasis, the iasis sapphire, is a butterfly in the family Lycaenidae. It is found in Senegal, Gambia, Guinea, Liberia, Ivory Coast, Ghana, Togo, Nigeria, Cameroon, Gabon, Angola, the Democratic Republic of the Congo, Uganda and Kenya. The habitat consists of forests and savanna. The species has also been recorded in cocoa plantations.

The larvae feed on the flowers of Loranthus incanus and Tapinanthus bangwensis. Young larvae are pink or red. Later, they may become yellow or yellow orange.

Subspecies
Iolaus iasis iasis (Senegal, Gambia, Guinea, Liberia, Ivory Coast, Ghana, Togo, Nigeria: south and the Cross River loop, Cameroon, Gabon, Angola, northern Democratic Republic of the Congo)
Iolaus iasis albomaculatus Sharpe, 1904  (Uganda, western Kenya)

References

External links

Die Gross-Schmetterlinge der Erde 13: Die Afrikanischen Tagfalter. Plate XIII 68 f

Butterflies described in 1865
Iolaus (butterfly)
Butterflies of Africa
Taxa named by William Chapman Hewitson